Gołków  is a village in the administrative district of Gmina Piaseczno, within Piaseczno County, Masovian Voivodeship, in east-central Poland.

On 9 July 1794 it was the site of the Battle of Gołków, fought in the early stages of the Kościuszko Uprising

References

Villages in Piaseczno County